The National Football League (Under-19) (NFL Under-19) was an annual played a youth league competition featuring football clubs from India. Founded in 2001 through the All India Football Federation (AIFF), the NFL was the first youth football league in India to be organized on a national scale. The U19 teams of the National Football League teams took part in the competition. The I-League U19 was founded in 2008 as new youth league.

Champions

See also

AIFF
I-League
I-League 2nd Division
Indian Super League

References

 
 
Youth football in India
Football leagues in India
Sports leagues in India
Professional sports leagues in India
Defunct football leagues in India